Johannes Jacobus Engelbrecht (born 22 February 1989) is a former South African professional rugby union player who played as a wing or outside centre.

Rugby career

Youth

Engelbrecht attended Grey High School in the Eastern Cape until 2007, where he also played rugby for their first XV rugby team, alongside fellow future professional Tim Whitehead. He also earned a call-up to represent Eastern Province at the premium high school rugby union competition – the Under-18 Craven Week – held in Stellenbosch in 2007.

Western Province / Blue Bulls

After finishing high school, Engelbrecht moved to Cape Town to join the  academy. He represented them in the domestic Currie Cup and Vodacom Cup competitions between 2009 and 2011, before joining teammates Johann Sadie and Lionel Cronjé in making the move to Pretoria to join the  ahead of the 2012 season. He established himself in the  Super Rugby team during the 2012 Super Rugby season, scoring three tries in seventeen appearances in the competition. He broke into the national team and signed a contract extension in June 2013 to keep him at the  until 2016.

Toyota Industries Shuttles

After the 2015 Super Rugby season, Engelbrecht joined Japanese Top League side Toyota Industries Shuttles for the 2015–2016 season.

Ospreys

In January 2016, the Bulls released him from his contract to join Welsh Pro12 side Ospreys for the remainder of the 2016–2017 season.

Representative rugby

He made a further eleven appearances for the Springboks during 2013 and was offered a core contract by the Springboks for 2014, but failed to feature in any matches for the national team.

Engelbrecht also missed out on selection for the 2015 Rugby World Cup, but did play in a match for a World XV against a South Africa XV in a warm-up match prior to the tournament.

References

Living people
1989 births
South African rugby union players
South Africa international rugby union players
Rugby union players from Port Elizabeth
Western Province (rugby union) players
Bulls (rugby union) players
Blue Bulls players
Rugby union wings
Rugby union centres
Afrikaner people
South African people of Dutch descent
Stellenbosch University alumni
Toyota Industries Shuttles Aichi players
South African expatriate rugby union players
South African expatriate sportspeople in Japan
Expatriate rugby union players in Japan
Ospreys (rugby union) players
South African expatriate sportspeople in Wales
Expatriate rugby union players in Wales
Sunwolves players
Stormers players
ASM Clermont Auvergne players